Muhammed Conteh (born 31 March 1996) is a Gambian international footballer who plays for Mbour Petite-Côte, as a midfielder.

Career
Born in Wellingara, he has played club football for Stade de Mbour and Mbour Petite-Côte.

He made his international debut for Gambia in 2016.

References

1996 births
Living people
Gambian footballers
The Gambia international footballers
Stade de Mbour players
Mbour Petite-Côte FC players
Association football midfielders
Gambian expatriate footballers
Gambian expatriate sportspeople in Senegal
Expatriate footballers in Senegal